Oedignatha is a genus of Asian spiders first described by Tamerlan Thorell in 1881 as a genus of corinnid sac spiders, and moved to Liocranidae in 2014.

Species
 it contains thirty-seven species in Southeast Asia, several of which were transferred from other genera, including O. aleipata from Storena, O. andamanensis & O. raigadensis from Amaurobius, O. proboscidea from Corinna, and O. ferox from the former monotypic genus Aepygnatha.
Oedignatha affinis Simon, 1897 – Sri Lanka
Oedignatha albofasciata Strand, 1907 – India
Oedignatha aleipata (Marples, 1955) – Samoa
Oedignatha andamanensis (Tikader, 1977) – India (Andaman Is.)
Oedignatha barbata Deeleman-Reinhold, 2001 – Thailand
Oedignatha bicolor Simon, 1896 – Sri Lanka
Oedignatha binoyii Reddy & Patel, 1993 – India
Oedignatha bucculenta Thorell, 1897 – Myanmar
Oedignatha canaca Berland, 1938 – Vanuatu
Oedignatha carli Reimoser, 1934 – India
Oedignatha coriacea Simon, 1897 – Sri Lanka
Oedignatha dentifera Reimoser, 1934 – India
Oedignatha escheri Reimoser, 1934 – India
Oedignatha ferox (Thorell, 1897) – Myanmar
Oedignatha flavipes Simon, 1897 – Sri Lanka
Oedignatha gulosa Simon, 1897 – Sri Lanka
Oedignatha indica Reddy & Patel, 1993 – India
Oedignatha jocquei Deeleman-Reinhold, 2001 – Thailand
Oedignatha lesserti Reimoser, 1934 – India
Oedignatha major Simon, 1896 – Sri Lanka
Oedignatha microscutata Reimoser, 1934 – India
Oedignatha mogamoga Marples, 1955 – Seychelles, Malaysia, Indonesia (Borneo). Introduced to Samoa
Oedignatha montigena Simon, 1897 – Sri Lanka
Oedignatha platnicki Song & Zhu, 1998 – China (Hong Kong), Taiwan
Oedignatha poonaensis Majumder & Tikader, 1991 – India
Oedignatha proboscidea (Strand, 1913) – Sri Lanka
Oedignatha procerula Simon, 1897 – India
Oedignatha raigadensis Bastawade, 2006 – India
Oedignatha retusa Simon, 1897 – Sri Lanka
Oedignatha rugulosa Thorell, 1897 – Myanmar
Oedignatha scrobiculata Thorell, 1881 (type) – Seychelles, Reunion, India, Thailand, Malaysia, Philippines, Indonesia, Taiwan
Oedignatha shillongensis Biswas & Majumder, 1995 – India
Oedignatha sima Simon, 1886 – Thailand
Oedignatha spadix Deeleman-Reinhold, 2001 – Indonesia (Sulawesi, Lesser Sunda Is.)
Oedignatha striata Simon, 1897 – Sri Lanka
Oedignatha tricuspidata Reimoser, 1934 – India
Oedignatha uncata Reimoser, 1934 – India

References

Araneomorphae genera
Liocranidae
Spiders of Asia
Taxa named by Tamerlan Thorell